Mystic is an unincorporated community within Breckinridge County, Kentucky, United States.

History

Limestone rock is the resource that a town coalesced at Mystic. Mystic's original named was "Pierce".

Dry Valley Baptist Church is located in Mystic.

References

Unincorporated communities in Breckinridge County, Kentucky
Unincorporated communities in Kentucky